Walter Ernest Padley (24 July 1916 – 15 April 1984) was a British Labour Member of Parliament for Ogmore. He was also President of the Union of Shop, Distributive and Allied Workers from 1948 to 1964.

Early life 
Walter Ernest Padley was born on 24 July 1916, the son of Ernest and Mildred Padley. In 1933, whilst still a teenager, he became active in a distributive workers' trade union. He was educated at Chipping Norton Grammar School and Ruskin College, Oxford with a TUC scholarship.

During the Second World War, he registered as a conscientious objector, but after appearances at both his Local and the Appellate Tribunals, he was permitted only exemption from combatant service, and was required to serve in the Non-Combatant Corps (NCC).

Political career 
Padley was a member of the National Council of the Independent Labour Party from 1940 to 1946. During this time, he contested the 1943 by-election in Acton, in which he was an (ILP) candidate, coming a distant second to the Conservative candidate. There was no Labour Party candidate, due to a pact between members of the wartime coalition. In 1950, Padley was elected as the Labour Member of Parliament for the party's safe seat of Ogmore, and served until the 1979 general election. He was a member of the party's National Executive Committee from 1956 to 1979.

In Parliament, he was Minister of State for Foreign Affairs from 1964 to 1967. Padley was also Chairman of the Labour Party from 1965 to 1966, and its Overseas Committee from 1963 to 1971.

Personal life and death 
In 1942, he married Sylvia Elsie Wilson; they had a son and daughter. He lived in Highgate, north London, and died on 15 April 1984, aged 67.

Bibliography 
 The Economic Problem of the Peace London: Gollancz (1944)
 Marcus Aurelius (pen name) Am I My Brother's Keeper?  London: Gollancz (1945)
 Britain: Pawn or Power? London: Gollancz (1947)
 Soviet Russia: Free Union or Empire? Bombay: National Info. & Publications (1947)

References
Times Guide to the House of Commons October 1974

1916 births
1984 deaths
Alumni of Ruskin College
Welsh Labour Party MPs
Independent Labour Party National Administrative Committee members
British trade unionists
UK MPs 1950–1951
UK MPs 1951–1955
UK MPs 1955–1959
UK MPs 1959–1964
UK MPs 1964–1966
UK MPs 1966–1970
UK MPs 1970–1974
UK MPs 1974
UK MPs 1974–1979
British conscientious objectors
Chairs of the Labour Party (UK)
Personnel of the Non-Combatant Corps
Ministers in the Wilson governments, 1964–1970